Epitolina dispar, the common epitolina, is a butterfly in the family Lycaenidae. It is found in Guinea, Sierra Leone, Liberia, Ivory Coast, Ghana, Togo, Nigeria (south and the Cross River loop), Cameroon, Equatorial Guinea, Gabon, the Republic of the Congo, the Central African Republic, Angola, the Democratic Republic of the Congo (Katako-Kombe and Sankuru), Uganda and north-western Tanzania. Its habitat consists of primary and secondary forests.

Adults have been recorded feeding from the secretions of ant-attended coccids.

References

Butterflies described in 1887
Poritiinae
Butterflies of Africa
Taxa named by William Forsell Kirby